Shihan Mihiranga Bennet (born 18 March 1985), is a Sri Lankan musician, composer and songwriter. Considered one of the best products of reality shows, Mihiranga often known as the "Dream Boy" of the youth in Sri Lanka. He became the youth sensation in 2000s after Namal Udugama in 1990s.

Personal life
Shihan was born on 18 March 1985 in Weliweriya as the eldest of the family. His father, Tyronne Bennet was a Sound Engineer, previously worked at Bahrain and mother Nilu Mallika is a housewife. He has a sister, Shanika Mihiravi. He studied at De Mazenod College, Kandana.

Shihan married Gishni Clementa Silva on 25 February 2012. Their love story had reportedly started 9 years earlier and it had been a secret to the media until the wedding. The wedding was held at St. Mary's church in Nayakakanda, Hendala. Clementa is the daughter of Upali Silva, who is a PTI of Shihan's school. The wedding photography was done by Dayan Witharana. The couple has two sons, the elder son is Shihan Kenneth Yarsh and the younger one is Shihan Glen Marsh.

Shihan was critically hospitalized by dengue fever in 2017, but recovered after treatments. However, several false rumors stated that he is dead.

Career
He applied to the first season of singing reality show Sirasa Superstar. It is the first reality show in Sri Lanka, where 12 male finalists were selected. Mihiranga came fifth place in the competition despite being the most popular star throughout the show. He sang mostly Rookantha Gunathilake's songs including, Dawasakda Hendewaka, Nihanda Maruthe and As Deka Piyana. 

After finishing the competition, he released his first album Dreams of Shihan in 2006. All the songs were written and music composed by himself and became highly popular among young generations. The album won Most Popular Album award in that year as well. Then in 2008 he released his second album, Dreamz 2 – My Life which includes lyrics and composing by other musicians. 

Shihan released his first music video Ada Thaniyen maa which was a great hit in Sri Lanka. Later it won the most popular music video award at Derana Music Video Awards in 2007. 
He is also a playback singer who rendered his voice for many films including Suwanda Danuna Jeewithe. His songs Perada Mewu Sina, Ron Suwanda Dena and Sith Mal Hegum Popiyana Yame in the film were highly popularized. He did playback singing for the song, Raya Pibidee in the movie Super Six.

In Sirasa Superstar season 4 which was renamed Generation 4, Shihan compered the program along with Nirosha Perera. He also sang the theme song Yawwane Sihina Yata Daelwune for the competition.

In 2013 he became a judge of the Sirasa Super Star season 5.

In 2018, Mihiranga became a judge of the singing reality show Hiru Star on Hiru TV for first three seasons. 

In 2020, he released his wedding song Oba Magemai.

Brand ambassador
He currently acts as the Brand Ambassador for Mobitel Smart 5, and Tiara Rollo cake of Ceylon Biscuits Limited.

Albums

Track listing

Track listing

Single song tracks released

References

External links
 
 ශිහාන් මිහිරංග නැවතත් පියෙක් වෙයි
 ජීවිතේ ආපස්සට යන්න පුළුවන්නම්
 “මම අසාර්ථක විවාහ ජීවිතයක් ගෙවන බවත් බිරිඳගේ ආදරය නොලැබෙන බවත් කියලා තමයි හොර ශිහාන් මිහිරංග මේ ළමයින්ට චැට් කරලා තියෙන්නේ”
 මගේ පින්තූර, වීඩියෝ අද දකිද්දී
 අවුරුදු ගානකට පස්සේ ප්‍රසිද්ධ වැඩසටනකදී ශිහාන්ගේ තාත්තා ගැන වෙනත් කෙනෙක් කියපු කතාවට සියලුදෙනා පුදුම වෙයි

1985 births
Living people
21st-century Sri Lankan male singers
Sri Lankan composers
Alumni of De Mazenod College
Sri Lankan Roman Catholics
Sinhalese singers